The following are the national records in track cycling in Czech Republic maintained by the Czech Cycling Federation.

Men
Key to tables:

Women

References
General
Czech Cycling Records 8 September 2022 updated
Specific

External links
Czech Cycling Federation website

Czech
Records
Track cycling
track cycling